Rusko Selo is a village in northeastern Serbia, located within the Kikinda municipality, North Banat District, Vojvodina.

Name
In Serbian the village is known as Rusko Selo (Руско Село), meaning "Russian Village". In German it is known as Ruskodorf, and in Hungarian as Kisorosz or Torontáloroszi.

History
In the Middle Ages, the settlement was known as Oroszi. During Ottoman times, it was populated by Serbs. In 1718, it was incorporated into the Habsburg province of Banat of Temeswar, at which time it was known in Serbian as Mali Orosin. In 1723–25, the place was uninhabited. It was repopulated in 1767 by German colonists, while Hungarian colonists were settled in the village in 1776. In the 19th century, Romanians settled in the village as well. After World War I, a new settlement known as Kolonija or Čarnojevićevo was built near the old village. After World War II, Serb refugees from Bosnia settled in the village.

Culture
Serbian Orthodox church of the Ascension of Holy Madonna, built in 1797
Roman Catholic church of St. Peter and Paul, built between 1802 and 1832
Čarnojević family mausoleum (sr)

Demographics
The village has a Serb ethnic majority and a population of 2,811 (2011 census).

In 2002 village had population of 3,328 and ethnic groups in the village were: Serbs (1,880) or 56.49%, Hungarians (1,181) or 35.48%, Yugoslavs (55), Roma (48), Montenegrins (43), Croats (18), Ukrainians (12), etc.

Historical population
1948: 4,294
1953: 4,341
1961: 4,143
1971: 3,830
1981: 3,657
1991: 3,510
2002: 3,328

See also
List of places in Serbia
List of cities, towns and villages in Vojvodina

References

Slobodan Ćurčić, Broj stanovnika Vojvodine, Novi Sad, 1996.

External links 

Elementary school – official page
 
Interesting news (In Serbian)
Economy news (In Serbian)
 Ethno-news (In Serbian)
Criminal news (In Serbian)

Populated places in Serbian Banat
Populated places in Vojvodina
Kikinda